Optimization Programming Language (OPL) is an algebraic modeling language for mathematical optimization models, which makes the coding easier and shorter than with a general-purpose programming language. It is part of the CPLEX software package and therefore tailored for the IBM ILOG CPLEX and IBM ILOG CPLEX CP Optimizers. The original author of OPL is Pascal Van Hentenryck.

References 

Mathematical optimization software
Algebraic modeling languages